Hong Kong Chinese may refer to:
One of the official languages of Hong Kong 
Hong Kong Cantonese, the prominent Chinese language spoken in Hong Kong
Hong Kong people, with Chinese nationality or of Chinese ethnicity
Hongkong Chinese Bank, a bank in Hong Kong

Language and nationality disambiguation pages